Figueira Muita is a settlement in the northern part of the island of Santiago, Cape Verde. It is part of the municipality of Tarrafal. In 2010 its population was 160. It is located about 2 km south of Ribeira da Prata and 8 km south of Tarrafal.

References

Villages and settlements in Santiago, Cape Verde
Tarrafal Municipality